GURPS Horseclans is a role-playing worldbook, one of the first that was published for the GURPS game system. Horseclans was a science fiction series by Robert Adams, set in a North America that had been thrown back to a medieval level by a nuclear war.

Contents
GURPS Horseclans is a GURPS supplement describing the milieu of the Horseclans, a postholocaust world of barbarian nomads. The book includes the history and background of the future world and the land of Mehrikah, plus rules for creation of Horseclans characters, numerous psionic abilities, and mass combat. This setting is based on Robert Adams' Horseclans novels.

Horseclans is set about a thousand years in a post-apocalyptic future after the collapse of our present civilization (apparently by a nuclear war). The setting's technology is primitive, but with some remnants of "magical" higher technology mostly in the hands of a cabal of pre-catastrophe technologists who have a way to transfer their minds from old bodies to new. They are opposed mainly by a small group of Undying, individuals who don't age and are very hard to kill.

Publication history
GURPS Horseclans: Roleplaying in Robert Adams' Barbarian Future was written by Steve Jackson and Jerry Epperson, with a cover by Ken Kelly, and was first published by Steve Jackson Games in 1987 as a 96-page book.

GURPS Horseclans was one of the earliest licensed properties produced by Steve Jackson Games.

See also GURPS Bili the Axe - Up Harzburk! a Horseclans Solo Adventure Campaign.

Reception

References

GURPS 1st/2nd edition
Horseclans
Post-apocalyptic role-playing games
Role-playing game supplements introduced in 1987
Role-playing games based on novels